For the Honor is the first live album from the American contemporary worship band Elevation Worship. It was recorded live at Elevation Blakeney. Provident Label Group released the album on November 21, 2011. Aaron Robertson produced the album.

Critical reception

Tincan Caldwell of Jesus Freak Hideout, rating the album three and a half stars out of a possible five, says that "The creative will it would take to make a whole new worship liturgy for your church body is laudable, and the Elevation Church in Charlotte, North Carolina has written a commendable and solid batch of songs, as they demonstrate on their live recording For the Honor." Awarding the album three and a half stars, David Jeffries of AllMusic stated that the album "flirts with arena rock, synth pop, and dance-pop, delivering its gospel message with a contemporary punch and mass-appeal beats." Jono Davies, signalling in a four star review at Louder Than the Music, writes, "If you enjoy the big guitars and big anthems then this album is well worth checking out."

Track listing

Chart positions

References

2011 live albums
Elevation Worship albums